Peter Fleming and John McEnroe were the defending champions but did not compete that year.

Jakob Hlasek and Claudio Mezzadri won in the final 7–6, 6–2 against Scott Davis and David Pate.

Seeds
Champion seeds are indicated in bold text while text in italics indicates the round in which those seeds were eliminated.

 Paul Annacone /  Christo van Rensburg (semifinals)
 Miloslav Mečíř /  Tomáš Šmíd (semifinals)
 Pat Cash /  Andrés Gómez (quarterfinals)
 Peter Doohan /  Laurie Warder (first round)

Draw

Finals

External links
 1987 Paris Open Doubles draw

Doubles